The Kasna Creek Mining District encompasses a historic copper mining claim on the Alaska Peninsula of southwestern Alaska.  The claim is located in the watershed of Kasna Creek, located on the south side of Kontrashibuna Lake, east of Port Alsworth, and was first staked in 1906 by Charles  Brooks and Count Charles Von Hardenberg.  They were reported in 1909 to have built a house and storage building near the mouth of the creek.  Although never developed, the claim continued to be of interest to mining companies into the 1950s, and was initially excluded from the nearby Lake Clark National Park and Preserve because of outstanding claims.

The area was listed on the National Register of Historic Places in 2010.

See also
National Register of Historic Places listings in Lake and Peninsula Borough, Alaska

References

Archaeological sites on the National Register of Historic Places in Alaska
Buildings and structures completed in 1906
Historic districts on the National Register of Historic Places in Alaska
Mining in Alaska
National Register of Historic Places in Lake and Peninsula Borough, Alaska
National Register of Historic Places in Lake Clark National Park and Preserve
1906 establishments in Alaska